Shuravi, shouravi, or shurwi is the Persian term for the word "Soviet" or just "Soviet Union", it has been derived from the word shura, a word of Arabic origin meaning "council".

This term is also the collective image of Soviet soldiers and military specialists in Afghanistan. The image has been widely spread among Afghan people. A motto "Marg bar shouravi", meaning "death to the Soviets", was popular among mujahideens.

Russian veterans of Soviet–Afghan War often call themselves Shuravi. The word is used in Iran meaning "USSR".

References

External links
 How are you... Shuravi?
 Shuravi Museum in Remembrance of Peacekeeping Soldiers

Soviet–Afghan War
Ethnic and religious slurs
Persian words and phrases
Afghanistan–Soviet Union relations
Afghan people of Russian descent